Thiago Rodrigues de Oliveira Nogueira (born October 20, 1988), known as Thiago Rodrigues is a Brazilian goalkeeper who plays  for Vitória.

Career
Thiago Rodrigues began his career with Paraná in the club's youth team before moving into the first-team, he made 16 league appearances in eight years for the club. In 2012, he and Paraná won the Campeonato Paranaense 2. Four years previous he completed a loan move to Rio Branco, but left without appearing in the league. Rodrigues departed Paraná in 2014 and subsequently joined the aforementioned Rio Branco permanently. He participated in 14 Campeonato Paranaense matches for Rio Branco as the club finished as runners-up before departing.

2015 saw a move to Caxias for Rodrigues, he made his Campeonato Gaúcho debut for Caxias against Grêmio Esportivo Brasil on 31 January before making his Série C debut on 17 May versus Madureira. He went onto make eight appearances in both competitions for Caxias before leaving to join Guarani in 2016. Following 16 appearances for Guarani in the 2016 Campeonato Catarinense, Rodrigues secured a transfer to Série A side Figueirense.

Honours
Paraná
Campeonato Paranaense Série Prata (1): 2012

CSA
Campeonato Alagoano (1): 2021

References

External links
CBF

1988 births
Living people
Brazilian footballers
Footballers from Curitiba
Association football goalkeepers
Paraná Clube players
Rio Branco Sport Club players
Sociedade Esportiva e Recreativa Caxias do Sul players
Figueirense FC players
Centro Sportivo Alagoano players
CR Vasco da Gama players
Esporte Clube Vitória players
Campeonato Brasileiro Série B players